Manjurul Imam was a Bangladeshi lawyer and politician. In 2023, the Government of Bangladesh nominated him for the Ekushey Padak posthumously.

Career 
Imam was a lawyer. He was the president of Khulna Metropolitan Awami League and a member of the Central Advisory Council. He was defeated as a candidate of Bangladesh Awami League from Khulna-2 seat in the fifth 1991, seventh 12 June 1996 and eighth national parliamentary elections in 2001.

Awards 

 Ekushey Padak- 2023

Death 
Manjurul Imam was killed on August 25, 2003, when he was going to the court by rickshaw from his house on Shamsur Rahman Road, Khulna, in a bomb attack.

References 

2003 deaths
Bangladeshi lawyers
Bangladeshi politicians
Recipients of the Ekushey Padak
People from Khulna District
Awami League politicians